Dongseo University (DSU) is a private university in Busan, the second largest city of South Korea.  Established in 1992 through the Dongseo Educational Foundation, it provides higher education to approximately 11,000 full-time students, including roughly 1000 international students from 69 countries.

In 2013, DSU was ranked by Quacquarelli Symonds with The Chosun Ilbo among the Top 50 Asian universities for internationalization.  It has Memorandums of Agreement with 215 institutions in 38 countries and operates branch campuses in China and the U.S.  It also runs joint degree programs with partner universities in Brazil, China, Indonesia, Lithuania, Malaysia, and Vietnam.

At its Busan campuses, Dongseo University offers undergraduate degrees in 57 departments and graduate degrees in 10 departments. These comprise 14 divisions along with the College of Design and the Im Kwon Taek College of Film and Media Arts.

Areas of specialization at Dongseo University include Design, Digital Contents (Game, Animation, Visual Effects), Film & Video, and Information Technology.  DSU also operates the Global Studies Institute, which provides services for international students and oversees the English-based undergraduate degree programs in Business Administration, Biomedical Laboratory Science, Computer Engineering, Digital Contents, Graphic Design, International Studies, and Film & Video.

History

The Dongseo Educational Foundation was established by Dr. Chang Sŏng-man with the aim of spreading higher education in South Korea based on the spirit of Christianity. In 1965, the foundation opened Kyungnam College of Information and Technology. This was followed by Dongseo University in 1992 and Busan Digital University in 2002. Collectively, the three educational institutions have roughly 23,000 students and employ over 1,000 professors and staff.  Dr. Dong Soon Park is the current chancellor of the Dongseo Educational Foundation.

The name originally given to DSU was Dongseo College of Technology. However, one year later this was changed to Dongseo University of Technology, and in 1996 the name Dongseo University was officially adopted.

In its first year, DSU accepted 400 students in 8 departments based primarily in fields of engineering and technology.  The university was founded by Dr. Sung Man Chang, who also served as university president until 1999, when he was elected as First Chairman of the Busan Christian Organization. Dongseo University is now led by Dr. Jekuk Chang.

Educational concepts

Dongseo University is guided by the following educational concepts.

Character Building Education
DSU fosters compassion on the basis of love, service and responsibility.

Foreign Language Education
DSU fosters international leadership through foreign language acquisition.

Informatics Education
DSU fosters information processing abilities needed in today’s information-based society.

Industry-University Cooperation Education
DSU fosters community development through industry-university collaboration.

Academics
Dongseo University is academically structured into 14 divisions and 2 colleges. It offers undergraduate degrees in 57 departments and graduate degrees in 10 departments. The programs overseen by the Global Studies Institute offer undergraduate degrees through English-based instruction.

Campuses

Dongseo University has two campuses in Busan, South Korea.  Its main campus is located near Jurye Station in the Sasang District of the city.  This campus covers an area of 82 acres and has 31 buildings.

The second Busan campus is commonly referred to as the Centum Campus due to its location in the Centum City area of the Haeundae District.  This campus opened in 2012 and is the main site of the Im Kwon Taek College of Film and Media Arts and the Division of Tourism.  The campus is situated in an 18-story building with an overall area of 16,532 square meters.

Dongseo University also operates branch campuses with partner institutions in China and the U.S., to each of which it sends 100 students annually as part of its Study Abroad Programs.

The branch campus in China is located in Wuhan at Zhongnan University of Economics and Law (ZUEL). DSU and ZUEL jointly run the Korea-China New Media Institute, a 4-year college formerly named the Korea-China International Education Institute.  This campus was established in 2011.

The branch campus in the U.S. is located in Fullerton, California at Hope International University.  Dongseo University also offers an Advanced Business Management Program through the U.S. campus, which was established in 2011.

Partner institutions

Dongseo University has signed Memorandums of Agreement with 215 institutions in 38 countries.

International programs

In addition to the Study Abroad Programs operated through its branch campuses, Dongseo University participates in various other international programs.  Many of these are run in connection with fellow Asian University Presidents Forum members.

Active programs include Global Access Asia, an online credit-based course sharing platform; Asia Summer Program, a 3-week credit-based summer program; CAMPUS Asia, a student mobility program operated with Guangdong University of Foreign Studies in China and Ritsumeikan University in Japan; and Dongseo Asia Initiatives Program, a short-term program enabling teams of students to conduct independent research projects abroad in Asia.

List of colleges and universities in South Korea
Education in South Korea

References

External links
DSU website (Korean)
DSU website (English)

Educational institutions established in 1992
Dongseo University
1992 establishments in South Korea